Anthoporia is a fungal genus in the family Meripilaceae. It is a monotypic genus, circumscribed in 2016 to contain the single species Anthoporia albobrunnea.

Taxonomy
The fungus was first described scientifically by Swedish mycologist Lars Romell in 1911, who called it Polyporus albobrunneus. Over the following several decades, it was shuffled to several general by different authors: Leptoporus (Pilát, 1938), Poria (D.V.Baxter), Tyromyces (Bondartsev, 1953), Antrodia (Ryvarden, 1973), Coriolellus (Domanski, 1974), and Piloporia (Ginns, 1984).

Habitat and distribution
In 2004, Anthoporia albobrunnea was one of 33 species proposed for protection under the Bern Convention by the European Council for Conservation of Fungi.

References

Taxa described in 2016
Fungi of Europe
Fomitopsidaceae